Ouyang Zhan (758–801; courtesy name Xingzhou 行周) was a Chinese poet and politician of the late Tang dynasty. The account of his death from grief for a deceased lover gained great popularity in ninth-century China.

Life
Ouyang was born in Panhu village, Chidian, Jinjiang, Fujian. His family had resided for several generations in the southeast and included magistrates and assistants in Quanzhou who came to service without examination.

Ouyang Zhan completed the jinshi degree in 792, alongside Han Yu and many other notable scholars in the year that came to known as the “list of tigers and dragons”. Han Yu claimed that Ouyang Zhan was the first scholar of national standing to emerge from the southeast, a claim repeated by Wang Dingbao, but there were at least three degreeholders in the early eighth century from the Southeast.

Ouyang became assistant lecturer at the College of the Four Gates at the Imperial Academy in 799 and held it until his death.

Ouyang became an ardent participant in Han Yu's Classical Prose Movement. His writings have been compiled in ten volumes. His poetry appears in a section of the compilation Quan Tangshi.

Death
Ouyang fell in love with a courtesan from Taiyuan. When his official duties forced him to leave her, he promised to return.
However, she was unable to muster the patience required and died of loneliness. When Ouyang heard the news, he too died of grief. This story was recounted in Meng Jian's (孟簡; jinshi 791) "Recounting Ouyang Xingzhou’s Affairs", a work about Ouyang's relationship with the courtesan that led to both of their deaths. In addition, Han Yu's elegy for Ouyang became a famous historical homage.

Legacy
Ouyang Zhan had three sons and is the first ancestor of all the majority of Ouyang surnames in Jinjiang.

References
 New Book of Tang 203.5786-7.
 Hong, Yue. "Romantic Identity in the Funerary Inscriptions (muzhi) of Tang China." Asia Major (third series) 25.1 (2012): 33-62. 
 Moore, Oliver J. Rituals of Recruitment in Tang China: Reading an Annual Programme in the Collected Statements By Wang Dingbao (870-940). Leiden: Brill, 2004.

Notes

External links 
Book 349 of the Quan Tangshi (which collects Ouyang Zhan's poems) in the Chinese Text Project

758 births
801 deaths
8th-century Chinese poets
9th-century Chinese poets
People from Jinjiang, Fujian
Poets from Fujian
Politicians from Quanzhou
Tang dynasty poets
Tang dynasty politicians from Fujian